The Singapore cricket team toured Malaysia in February 2016. The tour consisted of two 50-over matches and one Twenty20 match of Stan Nagaiah Trophy which is a series of limited overs cricket matches played between Malaysia cricket team and Singapore cricket team.

Squads

Matches

1st match

2nd match

3rd Match

References

External links
 Malaysian Cricket Association
 Series home at ESPN Cricinfo

Cricket in Malaysia
Cricket in Singapore
International cricket competitions in 2015–16